The 4th General Assembly of the Island of St. John represented the colony of Prince Edward Island, then known as St. John's Island, between 1785 and 1787.

The Assembly sat at the pleasure of the Governor of St. John's Island, Walter Patterson.

An election was held in March 1784 and the elected members met on March 6, 1784. The assembly spent several weeks discussing the members' grievances against the Governor and then adjourned without Patterson's consent. The Governor declared that the assembly had dissolved itself and called a new election in March 1785.

Alexander Fletcher was chosen as speaker.

Members

The members of the legislature after the general election of 1785 were:

References 
 Canada's Smallest Province, a history of prince edward island, ed. FWP Bolger (1973)

04
1785 establishments in Prince Edward Island
1787 disestablishments in Prince Edward Island